Robert Linn (1908–2004) was a long-serving Pennsylvania borough mayor. 

Robert Linn may also refer to:

Robert Linn (composer) (1925–1999), American composer
Robert L. Linn (1938–2015), American educational psychologist

See also
Robert Lynn (disambiguation)